This is a list of Brazilian television related events from 1972.

Events

Debuts
12 October - Vila Sésamo (1972-1977, 2007–present)

Television shows

Births

Deaths

See also
1972 in Brazil